= Coconut production in Vietnam =

Coconut production contributes to the national economy of Vietnam. According to figures published in December 2009 by the Food and Agriculture Organization of the United Nations, the country is the world's eighth largest producer of coconuts, producing 1,246,400 tonnes in 2009.
